The British at Work is a four-part BBC Two documentary series, broadcast in 2011. It is presented by Kirsty Young.

Episode list

References

External links

2010s British documentary television series
2011 British television series debuts
2011 British television series endings
BBC television documentaries
British television miniseries